The Article 29 Working Party (Art. 29 WP), full name "The Working Party on the Protection of Individuals with regard to the Processing of Personal Data", was an advisory body made up of a representative from the data protection authority of each EU Member State, the European Data Protection Supervisor and the European Commission.

The composition and purpose of Art. 29 WP was set out in Article 29 of the Data Protection Directive (Directive 95/46/EC), and it was launched in 1996. It was replaced by the European Data Protection Board (EDPB) on 25 May 2018 in accordance with the EU General Data Protection Regulation (GDPR) (Regulation (EU) 2016/679).

Its main stated missions were to:
 Provide expert advice to the States regarding data protection;
 Promote the consistent application of the Data Protection Directive in all EU state members, as well as Norway, Liechtenstein and Iceland;
 Give to the Commission an opinion on community laws (first pillar) affecting the right to protection of personal data;
 Make recommendations to the public on matters relating to the protection of persons with regard to the processing of personal data and privacy in the European Community.

The Working Party elected a chairman and two vice-chairmen, each with a two-year term of office. Their term of office was renewable only once. The Working Party's secretariat was provided by the European Commission.

The European Commission also hosts a website with documents adopted by the Art. 29 WP, press released from their plenary meetings, and other relevant information, such as on standard contractual clauses.

See also

 Data Protection
 European Union
 Right to be forgotten
 EU–US Privacy Shield

References

External links
 Art.29 Data Protection Working Party
 European Union page regarding Data Protection
 European Data Protection Supervisor

Data protection authorities
European Union law
1996 establishments in Europe